The 2021–22 season was the 118th season in the existence of Bayer 04 Leverkusen and the club's 43rd consecutive season in the top flight of German football. In addition to the domestic league, Leverkusen participated in this season's edition of the DFB-Pokal and the UEFA Europa League.

Players

First-team squad

Players out on loan

Transfers

In

Out

Pre-season and friendlies

Competitions

Overall record

Bundesliga

League table

Results summary

Results by round

Matches
The league fixtures were announced on 25 June 2021.

DFB-Pokal

UEFA Europa League

Group stage

The draw for the group stage was held on 27 August 2021.

Knockout phase

Round of 16
The draw for the round of 16 was held on 25 February 2022.

Statistics

Appearances and goals

|-
! colspan=14 style=background:#dcdcdc; text-align:center| Goalkeepers

|-
! colspan=14 style=background:#dcdcdc; text-align:center| Defenders

|-
! colspan=14 style=background:#dcdcdc; text-align:center| Midfielders

|-
! colspan=14 style=background:#dcdcdc; text-align:center| Forwards

|-
! colspan=14 style=background:#dcdcdc; text-align:center| Players transferred out during the season

Goalscorers

Last updated: 14 May 2022

References

Bayer 04 Leverkusen seasons
Bayer 04 Leverkusen
2021–22 UEFA Europa League participants seasons